Juan Manuel Acosta Díaz (born 11 November 1993) is a Uruguayan footballer who plays as a defender for Peñarol in the Uruguayan Primera División.

References

External links

1993 births
Living people
Rocha F.C. players
Cerro Largo F.C. players
Uruguayan Primera División players
Uruguayan Segunda División players
Uruguayan footballers
Association football defenders
People from Rocha, Uruguay